Hazel Musgrove (born 6 February 1989, Watford) is a British water polo player. She competed for Great Britain in the women's tournament at the 2012 Summer Olympics. This was the first ever Olympic GB women's water polo team.

References

1989 births
Living people
British female water polo players
Olympic water polo players of Great Britain
Water polo players at the 2012 Summer Olympics
Sportspeople from Watford

Ethnikos Piraeus Water Polo Club players